Stretford was a parliamentary constituency in North West England, which returned one Member of Parliament (MP)  to the House of Commons of the Parliament of the United Kingdom.

The constituency was created for the 1885 general election, and abolished for the 1997 general election. The constituency was centred on the town of Stretford and originally included an area to the south west of the city of Manchester. The boundaries changed considerably over its existence, at times extending east to include parts of the city itself and at other times including the towns of Irlam and Urmston to the west.

Boundaries

1885–1918

The Stretford Division of the County of Lancashire was formed by the Redistribution of Seats Act 1885. The constituency consisted of a number of civil parishes and townships to the south and south-east of the city of Manchester and north-east of the borough of Stockport:
Burnage
Chorlton-cum-Hardy
Didsbury
The portion of Heaton Norris outside the Borough of Stockport
Levenshulme
Reddish
Rusholme
Stretford
Withington

An extension of the boundaries of Manchester meant that Rusholme became part of the city later in 1885. A further enlargement saw Burnage, Chorlton-cum-Hardy, Didsbury and Withington included in Manchester in 1904. Similarly, the County Borough of  Stockport was enlarged to include Reddish in 1901 and Heaton Norris in 1913. These local government boundary changes did not affect the constituency until the next parliamentary redistribution in 1918.

1918–1950

The Representation of the People Act 1918 reorganised constituencies throughout the United Kingdom. A new Stretford Division of Lancashire was formed. The areas in Manchester and Stockport passed to the Manchester Rusholme, Manchester Withington and Stockport constituencies. The new Stretford constituency included areas further to the west and was defined as consisting of the following local government units of the administrative county of Lancashire:
The urban districts of Irlam, Stretford and Urmston
The civil parish of Astley in Leigh Rural District
The civil parish of Clifton in Barton upon Irwell Rural District

1950–1983

For the 1950 general election, a new Stretford borough constituency was created. The constituency comprised the Municipal Borough of Stretford (successor to the urban district) and the urban district of Urmston. The Astley area passed to the Leigh borough constituency and Clifton to the Farnworth county constituency.

1983–1997

Constituencies were redrawn for the 1983 general election to reflect the changes in local government in 1974. A new Stretford borough constituency, part of the Greater Manchester parliamentary county, was formed. The new constituency consisted of two wards of the City of Manchester, and five wards from the Metropolitan Borough of Trafford. The Manchester wards were Moss Side and Whalley Range, and the Trafford wards were Clifford, Longford, Park, Stretford and Talbot. Urmston became part of the new constituency of Davyhulme.

Abolition

The Parliamentary Constituencies (England) Order 1995, which came into effect for the 1997 general election, abolished the Stretford constituency. The area was redistributed, with Moss Side and Whalley Range added to an enlarged Manchester Central seat. The remainder became part of the new Stretford and Urmston constituency. The last MP for Stretford, Tony Lloyd, was subsequently elected as the Member of Parliament for Manchester Central.

Members of Parliament

Elections

Elections in the 1880s

Elections in the 1890s

Elections in the 1900s

Maclure died 28 January 1901.

Elections in the 1910s

 

  Robinson stood as an 'Independent Free Trade and Anti-Socialist' candidate, but he was claimed as a Liberal candidate and has thus been denoted as such.

Elections in the 1920s

Elections in the 1930s

Crossley died in an aeroplane crash off the coast of Denmark on 15 August 1939.

Elections in the 1940s

Elections in the 1950s

Elections in the 1960s

Elections in the 1970s

Elections in the 1980s

Boundary changes meant that the seat would notionally have been won by Labour in 1979 with a majority of 3,607.  The sitting MP, Winston Churchill, moved to the newly created Davyhulme constituency which included part of the pre-1983 Stretford seat

Elections in the 1990s

Notes and references 

Parliamentary constituencies in North West England (historic)
Constituencies of the Parliament of the United Kingdom established in 1885
Constituencies of the Parliament of the United Kingdom disestablished in 1997
Stretford
Politics of Trafford